Charles Barr House is a historic home located at Greenfield, Hancock County, Indiana.  It was built in 1893, and is a -story, Queen Anne style frame dwelling with a two-story rear wing. It sits on a brick foundation and has a steep gable roof. It features an elaborately detailed wraparound porch with a conical-roofed verandah.

It was listed on the National Register of Historic Places in 2008.

References

Houses on the National Register of Historic Places in Indiana
Queen Anne architecture in Indiana
Houses completed in 1893
Buildings and structures in Hancock County, Indiana
National Register of Historic Places in Hancock County, Indiana